The Codex Faenza (Faenza, Biblioteca Comunale 117) abbreviated as "(I-FZc 117)", and sometimes known as Codex Bonadies, is a 15th-century musical manuscript containing some of the oldest preserved keyboard music along with additional vocal pieces. The Codex Faenza fully appeared in modern notation on Keyboard Music of the Late Middle Ages in Codex Faenza 117 (Corpus Mensurabilis Musicae, Band 57) by Dragan Plamenac, American Inst. of Musicology (1972). The manuscript is held at the Biblioteca Comunale di Faenza, near Ravenna, but a facsimile with commentary by Pedro Memelsdorff was published by LIM in 2013.

The works of the manuscript are detailed below. The codes in the "Recordings" column are specified in the "Discography" section. The works added by Johannes Bonadies are specified with different color in the list.

References

15th-century manuscripts
Medieval music manuscript sources
Faenza